A (−)-menthol dehydrogenase is an enzyme that catalyzes the chemical reaction

(−)-menthol + NADP  (−)-menthone + NADPH + H,

i.e., catalyses the breakdown of menthol. Thus, the two substrates of this enzyme are (−)-menthol and NADP, whereas its 3 products are (−)-menthone, NADPH, and H.

This enzyme belongs to the family of oxidoreductases, specifically those acting on the CH-OH group of donor with NAD or NADP as acceptor. The systematic name of this enzyme class is (−)-menthol:NADP oxidoreductase. This enzyme is also called monoterpenoid dehydrogenase. This enzyme participates in monoterpenoid biosynthesis.

References 

 

EC 1.1.1
NADPH-dependent enzymes
Enzymes of unknown structure